Tomaševac is a village in Serbia. It is located in the Zrenjanin municipality, in the Central Banat District, Vojvodina province. The village has a Serb ethnic majority (92.12%) and its population numbering 1,765 people (2002 census).

Name
Names in other languages: , .

Historical population

1961: 2,532
1971: 2,354
1981: 2,149
1991: 1,904

References
Slobodan Ćurčić, Broj stanovnika Vojvodine, Novi Sad, 1996.

See also
List of places in Serbia
List of cities, towns and villages in Vojvodina

Populated places in Serbian Banat
Zrenjanin